About 75% of North Dakota is in the Central Time Zone, while the southwest quarter is in the Mountain Time Zone.

Mountain Time is observed in:
 Bowman County
 Adams County
 Slope County
 Hettinger County
 Grant County
 Stark County
 Billings County
 Golden Valley County
 Parts of Sioux County, Dunn County, and McKenzie County

Central Time is observed throughout the rest of the state.

IANA time zone database
In the IANA time zone database, North Dakota is covered by five time zones, columns marked "*" contain the data from the file zone.tab:

References

See also
 Time in the United States

North Dakota
Geography of North Dakota